Gnaeus Cornelius Lentulus was a consul of the Roman Republic in 97 BC. He had been praetor by 100 BC.  His consular colleague was Publius Licinius Crassus. During their consulship, the senate passed a decree banning human sacrifice. Despite the fame of the gens Cornelia and his attainment of Rome's highest office, little is known about this Lentulus.

References

1st-century BC Roman consuls
Roman Republican praetors
Cornelii Lentuli
Roman patricians